John August Witte (January 29, 1933 – March 17, 1993) was an American football tackle who played one season with the Saskatchewan Roughriders of the Canadian Football League. He was drafted by the Los Angeles Rams in the ninth round of the 1955 NFL Draft.

Early life
Witte played college football at Oregon State University and attended Klamath Union High School in Klamath Falls, Oregon. He was a Consensus All-American in 1956. Witte was also a wrestler at Oregon State and finished second at 
the NCAA Championships as a freshman. He served in the United States Army during the Korean War and became a corporal.

After football
After his football career, Witte had a brief career as a professional wrestler before moving into a career in education. He taught high school and coached football, including 24 years at Jefferson High School, where he served 17 years as dean of students.  He died of leukemia in Portland in 1993. He was inducted to the Oregon Sports Hall of Fame in 1983 and the Oregon State Athletics Hall of Fame in 1991.

References

External links
Just Sports Stats

1933 births
1993 deaths
Players of American football from Oregon
American football tackles
American players of Canadian football
Oregon State Beavers football players
Oregon State Beavers wrestlers
Deaths from leukemia
Saskatchewan Roughriders players
All-American college football players
United States Army non-commissioned officers
People from Klamath Falls, Oregon
American military personnel of the Korean War
Wrestlers from Oregon